Émilie Fortin (born 21 May 1999) is a Canadian professional racing cyclist, who currently rides for UCI Women's Continental Team Cynisca Cycling

References

External links

1999 births
Living people
Canadian female cyclists
Place of birth missing (living people)